= Office of the President of the United States =

Office of the President of the United States may refer to:

- Executive Office of the President of the United States, the presidential staff
- Oval Office, the room used as the presidential office
